"Inside the Beltway" is an American idiom used to characterize matters that are, or seem to be, important primarily to officials of the U.S. federal government, to its contractors and lobbyists, and to the media personnel who cover them – as opposed to the interests and priorities of the general U.S. population.

The Beltway refers to Interstate 495, the Capital Beltway, a circumferential highway (beltway) that has encircled Washington, D.C. (the capital of the United States) since 1964. Some speakers of American English now employ the word as a metonym for federal government insiders (cf. Beltway bandits), and the phrase "inside the Beltway" is used as a title for a number of political columns and news items by publications like the Washington Times, American University's magazine, and columnist John McCaslin.

Geographically, Inside the Beltway describes Washington, D.C. and those sections of Maryland and Virginia that lie within the perimeter of the Capital Beltway.

Usage
Reporting in 1975 on the prospect of a reexamination of the Warren Commission's findings concerning the assassination of John F. Kennedy, newspaper journalist Nicholas M. Horrock wrote:

Communities
The following cities and counties are located entirely or partially inside the Beltway:
Washington, D.C. (all DC land is inside the Beltway; a small portion of the Potomac River that is part of DC is outside the Beltway)
Alexandria, Virginia (almost all of Alexandria is inside the Beltway)
Arlington County, Virginia (entirely)
Fairfax County, Virginia (partially)
Falls Church, Virginia (entirely)
Montgomery County, Maryland (partially)
Prince George's County, Maryland (partially)

See also

Washington metropolitan area
Westminster Bubble

References

Political terminology of the United States
Washington metropolitan area